The Agua Rica mine is a large copper mine located in northwest Argentina, in Catamarca Province. Agua Rica represents one of the largest copper reserve in Argentina and in the world having estimated reserves of 384.9 million tonnes of ore grading 0.56% copper and 0.033% molybdenum.

References 

Copper mines in Argentina
Mines in Catamarca Province